HMS Seymour  was a Parker-class flotilla leader of the British  Royal Navy. She was built by Cammell Laird during the First World War, being launched on 31 August 1916 and completing on 30 November  that year. Seymour served with the Grand Fleet for the rest of the war, which she survived. The ship was sold for scrap in January 1931.

Construction and design
The Parker-class was an improved version of the earlier  with the forward two funnels of the Marksman-class merged into one and the ships' bridge moved rearwards, allowing an improved gun layout.

The ship's main gun armament consisted of four QF  Mk IV guns mounted on the ships centreline, with the forward two guns superfiring so that one could fire over the other, with one gun between the second and third funnel and one aft. Two 2-pounder (40 mm) "pom-pom" anti-aircraft guns were fitted, while torpedo armament consisted of two sets of twin 21 inch (533 mm) torpedo tubes. The standard anti-submarine armament for flotilla leaders such as Seymour from June 1916 onwards was two Type D depth charges on chutes, although the number of depth charges tended to increased as the war progressed and the importance of anti-submarine operations grew. The ship's complement was 116 officers and men.

Seymour, probably named for the Elizabethan Admiral Lord Henry Seymour, who took part in the defeat of the Spanish Armada in 1588,, was laid down on 23 November 1915, launched on 31 August 1916 and completed on 30 November that year. In 1917, Seymour was fitted to allow her to be used for minelaying, with the ability to carry 80 mines, although this capacity appears not to have been used in action.

Service
Following completion, Seymour joined the 11th Destroyer Flotilla of the Grand Fleet at Scapa Flow on 4 December 1916, serving as leader of the Flotilla, with  serving as a second leader. In July 1917, the flotilla, including Seymour, moved to Rosyth. From 15 June 1917 the destroyers and submarines of the Grand Fleet took part in Operation BB,  a large scale operation against German submarines, with 53 destroyers and leaders together with 17 submarines deployed on offensive patrols on the transit route for the Germans from the North Sea and around the Orkney and Shetland Islands to the Western Approaches. Seymour led destroyers of the 11th and 13th Flotillas on patrol to the east of Orkney. The flotilla's patrol area saw little activity, although two destroyers ( and ) were diverted to unsuccessfully search for a submarine that had reportedly been attacked by the British submarine . Overall, 61 sightings were made of German submarines were made by the destroyers and submarines of the Grand Fleet until the operation ended on 24 June, of which 12 resulted in attacks on the submarines, but no submarines were sunk or damaged. In October 1917, the Grand Fleet carried out another large-scale anti-submarine operation, in which destroyers and submarines were to be used to drive German U-boats that were returning to port from operations and passing to the east of the Dogger Bank into a large (several miles long) array of mine nets. Seymour took part in this operation, leading 10 destroyers in patrolling east of the Moray Firth and Firth of Forth. The operation lasted for 10 days, and British Intelligence believed that three U-boats were probably sunk in the operation. However, the submarines in question were almost certainly lost in other mine-fields.

Seymour remained part of the Grand Fleet until the end of the war. On 21 November 1918, Seymour helped to escort the German High Seas Fleet to the Firth of Forth prior to its internment at Scapa Flow, and while photographing the German ships, rescued the crew of an aircraft that crashed in the vicinity and salvaged the aircraft. In December 1919, Seymour transferred to the 21st Destroyer Flotilla, still based at Rosyth, where it served through to February. March saw the ship joining the newly reformed 4th Destroyer Flotilla, where she served until October 1919.

On 11 October 1919, Seymour arrived at Portsmouth and entered reserve. She was refitted at Pembroke Dock in June–July 1923, and in July 1924 was commissioned to take part in naval exercises before returning to reserve later that year.

Disposal
Seymour was sold to John Cashmore Ltd on 7 January 1930 for £9,650 and was removed to their works at Newport for scrapping on 13 February that year.

Pennant numbers

Notes

Citations

References

 
 

Parker-class flotilla leaders
World War I destroyers of the United Kingdom
Ships built on the River Mersey
1916 ships